Sophia is a 2006 EP released by The Crüxshadows. It accompanies the 2007 album DreamCypher. It peaked at #1 on the Billboard Hot Dance Singles Sales, and #7 on the Hot 100 Singles Sales, making it one of their most successful releases, second only to Birthday.

Track listing
"Sophia" (album version)
"Sophia" (radio edit)
"Titan"
"Sophia" (Here I Am Club Mix)
"Adrift"

External links
 The Crüxshadows' official website

2006 EPs
The Crüxshadows EPs